Threadneedles Hotel, formerly the head offices of the London, City and Midland Bank, is a 5-star London hotel with 74 rooms and suites. The hotel is located opposite the Bank of England on Threadneedle Street. It is a Grade II listed building.

History
The Eton Collection acquired a long-term lease from The Merchant Taylors’ Company and invested £21 million in the refurbishment of the historical building. Threadneedles Hotel was the first luxury hotel within the City of London's Square mile. The hotel's bar is set in the main banking hall of the Midland Bank.

Awards
The hotel has a five star status awarded by Quality in Tourism. Further awards included being voted "One of the top 50 hottest hotels in the world" by Condé Nast Traveler, and one of the top 20 hotels by Tatler Magazine.

References

External links
 

Autograph Collection Hotels
Buildings and structures in the City of London
Hotels established in 2002
Hotels in London
Grade II listed buildings in the City of London